Jill Scott may refer to:
 Jill Scott (singer) (born 1972), American soul singer and songwriter.
 Jill Scott (racing driver) (1902–1974), English racing driver
 Jill Scott (media artist) (born 1952), Australian media artist
 Jill Scott (footballer) (born 1987), English footballer

See also
 Gil Scott-Heron (1949–2011), American soul and jazz poet, musician, and author